Marian Tobin ran a safe house in Ireland during the Irish War of Independence and was known particularly for sheltering Dan Breen and Seán Treacy after the Soloheadbeg ambush, the incident which sparked the war.

Biography

She was born Mary Ann Carew in 1873 in Knockgraffon, Co. Tipperary. Her mother was farmer Bridget Carew. Her father had already died by 1901. She became Marian Tobin when she married James Tobin, a farmer from Tincurry House in 1902. They had three children May, Eva and John. They were a republican household and used their home as Battalion headquarters for the first company of the 6th Battalion. Tobin became a widow in 1918.

Seán Treacy, Dan Breen and Seán Hogan arrived on her doorstep on 22 January 1919, they had walked across the Galtees from Soloheadbeg. She hid the men then, and went on to hide men, arms, documents and evidence, she would clean guns and deliver people and messages for the Irish Republican Army. Her land was used to conduct drills. The IRA even experimented with explosives on her land. Her house was repeatedly raided by British forces but she was never found with anything that could be used against her.

In May 1921 the British forces arrived and destroyed her furniture and belongings and then blew up her house with explosives. No reason was given and nothing incriminating had ever been found. The family watched from the lawn.

Many of the women involved in the War of Independence were not listed as members of Cumann na mBan but in a letter supporting her application for her pension, it was said of Tobin that "whether or not you were officially a member of CnamB, you were de facto and de jure a member of the IRA."

In 1920, Tobin became Tipperary's first female county councillor. She held the position until 1925. Although entitled to a pension, Tobin did not request one until 1950 saying that while previously she had not needed help, she was now “sorely in need” of the money. The pension was granted in 1951.

References and sources

1873 births
Women in war
Date of death missing